Justine Pelmelay (born 24 September 1958) is a Dutch singer who represented the Netherlands in the Eurovision Song Contest in 1989. Her entry, "Blijf zoals je bent" (Stay the way you are) was placed fifteenth out of the 22 participating songs. 

Pelmelay made another attempt to go to Eurovision in 2005 with the song "What you see is what you get" but it did not qualify for the final of Nationaal Songfestival, Dutch National Selection for Eurovision.

Pelmelay was in the Costa Concordia when it was involved in the disaster which happened on 14 January 2012.

References

External links

1958 births
Living people
Eurovision Song Contest entrants for the Netherlands
Dutch women singers
Dutch people of Indonesian descent
Dutch people of Moluccan descent
Eurovision Song Contest entrants of 1989
People from Leiden
Nationaal Songfestival contestants